Jean (Jan) Théodore Frédéric Teichmann (3 August 1788 – 4 June 1867) was a Belgian engineer and politician. He was governor ad interim of the province of Antwerp from 11 October 1833 until 3 August 1834 and governor from 10 November 1845 until 4 April 1862.

Political career
Jan Teichmann was ad interim Belgian minister of Interior in 1831. He was a member of the Belgian Parliament from 1832 until 1835 and a Senator in the Belgian Senate from 1847 until 1848.

Sources
 Steve Heylen, Bart De Nil, Bart D’hondt, Sophie Gyselinck, Hanne Van Herck en Donald Weber, Geschiedenis van de provincie Antwerpen. Een politieke biografie, Antwerpen, Provinciebestuur Antwerpen, 2005, Vol. 2 p. 172

1788 births
1867 deaths
Governors of Antwerp Province
People from Antwerp Province